Alabama is a southern state in the United States.

Alabama may also refer to:

U.S. places
Alabama, New York, a town in Genesee County, New York
Alabama Port, Alabama, an unincorporated community in Mobile County
Alabama River, Alabama
Alabama Territory, a US territory from 1817 to 1819
Alabama Township, a former civil township in Sacramento County, California

Other places
Alabama Nunatak, NE Greenland

Music
Alabama (American band), country-music band formed in 1969
Alabama (Canadian band), band of the early 1970s
"Alabama", song by The Louvin Brothers from Tragic Songs of Life
"Alabama", song by Janis Ian on the 1971 album Present Company
"Alabama", song by Neil Young on the 1972 album Harvest
"Alabama", song by 10 Years on the 2008 album Division
"Alabama" (John Coltrane song), song on the album Live at Birdland
"Alabama" (state song), official state song of Alabama
"Alabama Song", a 1927 Berthold Brecht song prominently covered by the Doors and David Bowie
Alabama Song (album), released 1998 by Allison Moorer
"Sweet Home Alabama", 1974 song by Lynyrd Skynyrd
"Yea Alabama", fight song of the University of Alabama

People
Alabama people, Native Americans of the Southeastern culture
Alabama language, spoken by the Alabama-Coushatta tribe of Texas

Ships
CSS Alabama, a screw sloop-of-war built in 1862 for the Confederate States Navy
MV Maersk Alabama, former name of MV Maersk Andaman, hijacked by pirates in 2009
USS Alabama, several U.S. Navy ships
Alabama, a schooner built in 1926

Education
University of Alabama, public university in Tuscaloosa, Alabama, US

Other uses
Alabama Crimson Tide, the varsity teams that represent the University of Alabama
Alabama (moth), genus of moths in the family Erebidae
Alabama Stakes, thoroughbred stakes race run at the Saratoga Race Course

See also
Alabam (disambiguation)
University of Alabama (disambiguation)